Harvard Extension School (HES) is the extension school of Harvard University, a private research university in Cambridge, Massachusetts. Under the Division of Continuing Education of Harvard Faculty of Arts and Sciences (which also oversees the undergraduate Harvard College and graduate studies Harvard Graduate School of Arts and Sciences), Harvard Extension School offers more than 900 on-campus, online, and hybrid liberal arts and professional courses as open enrollment offerings for adult learners in and between the undergraduate/graduate level. 

The school confers graduate (ALM) and undergraduate (ALB) degrees, academic certificates, and a pre-medical program certificate. Degree candidate admission generally requires three "B or better" grades in degree-credit coursework at Harvard, followed by a formal application and an Extension School admissions committee decision. Since the school's inception, it has only graduated less than one-fifth of one percent of its students. As of the year 2009, nearly 13,000 have graduated with degrees and have become alumni and alumnae of the Harvard University.

History

Founded in 1910 by Harvard President A. Lawrence Lowell, the Harvard Extension School grew out of the Lowell Institute, created according to the terms of a bequest by John Lowell. It was designed to serve the educational interests and needs of the Greater Boston community, particularly those "who had the ability and desire to attend college, but also had other obligations that kept them from traditional schools."  It has since extended its academic resources worldwide.

During the 1920s, affiliates traveled around New England to teach courses offsite. While they were primarily aimed at teachers, courses were offered whenever 40 or more students expressed an interest. Professors traveled on a weekly basis to places as far away as Yonkers, New York, some 200 miles away.

In the early years, a commission composed of several Boston area schools ran the courses, though it was largely a Harvard-run program.   Early faculty included Charles Townsend Copeland, William Yandell Elliott, William L. Langer, Oscar Handlin, Perry Miller, John Kenneth Galbraith, and Frank M. Carpenter. 

In his will, John Lowell asked his successors to develop courses "more erudite and particular corresponding to the age and wants of the age."  By the 50th anniversary of the Commission of Extension in 1960, more than 1,400 courses had been offered for a total of over 85,000 enrollments. Lowell's bequest limited tuition to no more than "two bushels of wheat." During the Great Depression, this amounted to roughly $5 per semester course.

Several years after his retirement, President Lowell wrote that the Extension courses "have given a service to the public ... which seems to me of the utmost importance." In the 2010s, more than 100 years after its founding, the Extension School's classes were described as "surprisingly affordable" and the school itself was said to be a "thriving institution."

Degree development
The Extension School currently offers two degrees (and has offered these degrees since 1979): the Bachelor of Liberal Arts in Extension Studies (ALB) and the Master of Liberal Arts in Extension Studies (ALM).  From 1911 to 1933, the school offered an Associate in Arts, and from 1933 to 1960, it offered an Adjunct in Arts.  Both were considered the equivalent of a bachelor's degree. From 1971 to 2014, the school offered an Associate of Arts in Extension Studies (AA), the equivalent of a two-year degree.

Degree-name controversy 

A proposal before the Faculty of Arts and Sciences in 2009 and 2010 to rename the school and the degrees offered was not accepted.  A committee led by Professor of Computer Science Harry R. Lewis proposed renaming the school the "Harvard School of Continuing and Professional Studies" and dropping the words "in Extension Studies" from degrees so that the school would offer Bachelor of Liberal Arts, Master of Liberal Arts, and Master of Professional Studies degrees. Some faculty objected, saying that those degrees were too similar to "Bachelor of Arts" and "Master of Arts" degrees already offered by the college and the Graduate School of Arts and Sciences.

In 2016, a student group calling itself the Harvard Extension Degree Change Initiative rallied in front of University Hall to call for removing “Extension Studies” from the degree name and adding a student's field of study instead. The Harvard Crimson editorialized in favor, urging Harvard to "consider changing the title of Extension School degrees to include the field of study rather than the ambiguous 'Extension Studies.'" While the school retains "Extension Studies" in official degree titles, transcripts reflect students' area of academic concentration.

In 2019, then-Dean Huntington D. Lambert stated agreement with student complaints that degrees awarded by the Harvard Extension School should be rephrased to more accurately reflect students’ programs of study, but he was not successful in making any changes.

In 2022, members of the Harvard Extension Student Association, the student government of the Harvard Extension School, held a protest in Harvard Yard calling on the university to remove the words “in Extension Studies” from the Harvard Extension School Liberal Arts Degrees. In 2021 and 2022, the Harvard College Undergraduate Council and the Harvard Graduate Council each passed resolutions supporting the removal of the words “in Extension Studies” from degrees awarded by the Harvard Extension School.

Leadership

Deans
The dean of the extension school is also the Dean of the Harvard Division of Continuing Education, who works under and reports directly to the Dean of Harvard Faculty of Arts and Sciences. There have been seven deans in the school's history and three are alumni of Harvard College:
James Hardy Ropes, Chairman of Commission on Extension Courses, Dean of University Extension, 1910–1922
Arthur F. Whittem, Chairman of Commission on Extension Courses, Director of University Extension, 1922–1946
George W. Adams,  Chairman of Commission on Extension Courses, Director of University Extension, 1946–1949
Reginald H. Phelps,  Chairman of Commission on Extension Courses, Director of University Extension, 1949–1975
Michael Shinagel, Director of Continuing Education and University Extension, 1975–1977, and Dean of Continuing Education and University Extension, 1977–2013
Huntington D. Lambert, Dean of Continuing Education and University Extension, 2013–2019
Nancy Coleman, Dean of the Division of Continuing Education, 2020–present

Academics

Part of the Harvard Faculty of Arts and Sciences, Harvard Extension School offers more than 900 on-campus and online courses, most of which have open enrollment. The number of courses offered has continuously grown over the school's history.

Students may enroll full or part-time, and classes may be taken on campus, via distance-learning, or both. In order to earn an academic degree, students must complete a minimum number of on-campus-only credits at Harvard.

Non-degree students have access to the Harvard Library, including electronic resources and select computer facilities. Those registered for a course at the Extension School may also access writing tutorials at the Writing Center as well as assistance with math and related courses at the Math Question Center. Career services and academic advising are offered through the school's Career and Academic Resource Center.

Ropes, the school's first dean, said that "our aim will be to give the young people of Boston who have heretofore been prevented from securing a college education the same instruction they would receive were they undergraduates at Harvard." The Harvard Undergraduate Council found in a 2020 study of Extension courses that 156 were identical or nearly identical to courses at Harvard College and 95 were equivalent or similar, while 344 were unique to the Extension School. A New York Times guidebook stated that professors said some courses were "virtually identical." Courses at the college were $5,966.25 each in 2020, and courses at the Extension School were 69% less at $1,840.

A number of on-campus Harvard courses are recorded and offered to Extension students online. For these courses, office hours and other student support are typically available through live or asynchronous software. Extension degree candidates may also apply for "Special Student status" to enroll for up to two courses in Harvard College, Harvard Graduate School of Arts and Sciences, or another Harvard Graduate School. The majority of instructors at the Extension School, 52%, are Harvard affiliates; 48% are faculty from other schools and industry professionals. Nobel laureate Roy J. Glauber has taught Extension courses.

Students may enroll full or part-time, and classes may be taken on campus, via distance-learning, or both. In order to earn an academic degree, students must complete a minimum number of on-campus-only credits at Harvard.

Accreditation and partnerships
Harvard University is accredited by the  New England Commission of Higher Education.

Harvard Business School Online's Credential of Readiness (CORe) program can be counted for Extension School undergraduate academic credit.

The graduate program in Museum Studies has a partnership with the Smithsonian Institution. The partnered courses include two active learning weekends in Washington, D.C. Harvard Extension School has collaborated with Massachusetts Institute of Technology Micromasters program for Management, Sustainability, and Development Practice Masters degree program.

Pre-medical program
A pre-medical program was established at the Extension School in 1980. Students who successfully complete the program are eligible for sponsorship and a committee letter of support in their applications to medical school.

Distance education

History
Harvard Extension was a pioneer in distance education. Beginning on December 5, 1949, courses were offered on the Lowell Institute's new radio station. New Englanders could go to college six nights a week at 7:30 in their living rooms simply by tuning into courses on psychology, world history, and economics. The first course on radio was by Peter A. Bertocci of Boston University. 

The radio courses proved to be so successful that when the television station WGBH went on the air in October 1951 they began broadcasting an Extension class every weekday at 3:30 and 7:30. The first course, offered by Robert G. Albion, was on European Imperialism. In the late 1960s, three of the televised courses were offered in the Deer Island Prison. Students who watched the courses on television could attend six "conferences" and take a mid-term and a final exam at Harvard in order to gain credit for the class.

, distance-learning courses at Harvard Extension School are offered in two formats: asynchronous video courses (lectures are recorded and uploaded within 24 hours of on-campus class meetings); and live web-conference courses (courses are streamed live, and typically allow for synchronous participation from students via a secondary online platform).

The first online courses were offered in 1997.  Between 2013 and 2016, the number of online classes grew from 200 to more than 450.

Degree programs

To be eligible to apply to the Extension School's degree programs, students must "earn [their] way in" by passing the Test of Critical Reading and Writing Skills as well as completing two or three designated admission classes with a B or better. In 2016, then-Dean Huntington D. Lambert said that 32% of those who want to pursue an undergraduate degree (ALB) earn the grades necessary for admission, making admissions "very selective." If the admission requirements are met, acceptance is not guaranteed but very likely. About 85% of those admitted successfully earn their degree (ALB).

ALB students may graduate cum laude, but magna- and summa- cum laude are not offered. Extension students may earn the Dean's List Academic Achievement Award upon graduation based on a high GPA (at least 3.5 for ALB, 3.8 for ALM). Many courses are offered online, but a degree cannot be earned entirely online as students are required to take classes on campus before earning their degree.

Students who wish to earn degrees must be formally admitted by the Admissions Committee.  Admitted degree candidates are granted full privileges to Harvard's libraries, facilities, and student resources, as well as access to Harvard's museums and academic workshops.  As of 2019–20, an undergraduate degree cost about $58,800, and a graduate degree cost about $28,400–$34,080.

Of the over 30,000 students enrolled in the Extension School, 850 are admitted degree candidates for the Bachelor of Liberal Arts in Extension Studies (ALB) and 3,063 are admitted degree candidates for the Master of Liberal Arts in Extension Studies (ALM).

Bachelor of Liberal Arts (ALB)
The undergraduate curriculum requires expository writing, quantitative reasoning, foreign language, moral reasoning, upper-level coursework, and an area of concentration.  The expository writing class is known as a "gatekeeper course" as it will typically "determine whether [students] are prepared for the intensive and demanding curriculum."

Once admitted as an ALB degree candidate, students must successfully complete 128 credits (Harvard courses are typically 4 credits each) and maintain good academic standing to meet graduation requirements.  Upon admission into the ALB program, students may petition to transfer up to a maximum of 64 credits from other accredited post-secondary institutions, but 64 credits must be completed at Harvard. Students select one of three "areas of concentration" which are humanities, science, and social sciences.

ALB degree candidates are also required to complete a minimum of 16 on-campus-only credits at Harvard; students must also complete a minimum of 12 writing-intensive credits and earn a minimum of 52 credits in courses that are taught by Harvard instructors. In addition to a concentration, degree candidates have the option to pursue one of twenty "fields of study" (similar to majors). In order to successfully complete a field of study, students must earn a B− or higher in 32 Harvard credits in one field, and maintain a B average in the field. Students may also complement their degree with up to two minors.

Undergraduate admissions 
Undergraduate degree programs require pre-admission courses as well as a formal application process. Students must also hold a "high school diploma or its equivalent [which] must have been earned at least five years prior to enrolling in any ALB degree-applicable courses." Students applying for degree candidacy must complete three 4-credit liberal arts courses at Harvard with at least a B grade in each, and maintain a minimum 3.0 cumulative GPA. One of these three pre-admission courses must be EXPO E-25. To enroll in this course, students must either pass a placement test, which measures critical reading and writing skills, or enroll in EXPO E-15 (a course that acts as a precursor to EXPO E-25).  Students failing to earn at least a B in a class can retake it once. Those who meet all these criteria are then eligible to apply for admission into the school's undergraduate degree programs.

Master of Liberal Arts (ALM)
The Master of Liberal Arts in Extension Studies (ALM) includes 19 liberal arts fields of study and seven professional degree programs (Biotechnology, Information Technology, Journalism, Management, Mathematics for Teaching, Museum Studies, & Sustainability). Except for Museum Studies (10 courses), all ALM candidates must complete 12 courses—48 credit hours—with most requiring a thesis or capstone project crafted under the direction of an instructor or faculty member holding a teaching appointment in the Harvard Faculty of Arts and Sciences.

Graduate admissions 
Application to a graduate degree program requires an accredited bachelor's degree (or foreign equivalent), passing the Test of Critical Reading and Writing Skills, the completion of two or three designated pre-admission courses with grades of B or higher, and a cumulative grade-point average of 3.0. One of the pre-admission courses must be the "proseminar" course for the intended area of study, which is akin to a traditional research methods course. Some disciplines have additional specified pre-admission coursework, while others have specific coursework that is required before submitting a master's thesis proposal (biology and psychology students must take a specific graduate statistics course). In addition, several programs require supplemental application materials; for instance, Creative Writing and Literature ALM candidates must submit original manuscripts. Students who meet these criteria are then eligible to submit an application for admission into the graduate degree programs (ALM).

A student who fails to earn a grade of B after twice enrolling in the proseminar course—often considered a "gatekeeper" course—will be denied admission indefinitely.

Students who graduate from the Extension School become part of the Harvard Alumni Association. Extension students have dedicated study spaces, conferences rooms, an Extension library, and access to the dining hall in Lehman Hall. Alpha Sigma Lambda, the national honor society for nontraditional students, has a Harvard chapter. There is a student government body for the Harvard Extension School which participates in the Harvard Graduate Council.  Admitted degree candidates have access to many of the same student privileges of other Harvard alumni, such as access to athletic facilities, libraries, and museums. Candidates may, for example, access:

The class of 2019, the largest class to date, had 1,184 graduates. The graduates had an average age of 37 and were nearly evenly split between the genders, with 54% being male. 49 countries were represented in the graduating class.

In 2016, 96% of the students enrolled for professional enrichment. Half took a single course, and half were pursuing a degree. The increase in online course offerings has fueled growth, and students from more than 150 countries are enrolled. In 2017, the school educated more students than all of the rest of Harvard combined.

In 2000, there were 14,216 students, with the youngest in their early teens and the oldest in their late 80s. There is often a span of 60 years between the oldest and youngest students, and students as young as 11 years old have taken courses alongside those old enough to be their grandparents.  Of the students enrolled in 2000, 75% had a bachelor's degree and 20% had a graduate degree.  More than 1,700 were Harvard employees using the Tuition Assistance Program, and an estimated 10–15% were exclusively online students.  Of the 255 Certificate of Special Studies graduates that year, 163 were international students hailing from 39 countries.

In the early 2000s, there were 208 students under the age of 18. Most attended local high schools, but a growing number were home-schooled. The Extension School now requires that a high school diploma or its equivalent is earned at least five years prior to enrolling in any courses applicable to its undergraduate degree.

Harvard Extension School enrolls about 4,000 international students each year. To be admitted to courses or degrees, a student must prove proficiency in the English language. If English is not a student's native language, then he or she must submit an official TOEFL or IELTS score with a minimum score of 100 for the TOEFL or a minimum score of 7.0 for the IELTS. International students, like American students, must meet the on-campus-only course requirements to earn a degree. The Extension School does not issue I-20s for the F-1 visa but the Summer School does. In 2013, students came from 118 countries and 46 states.

Notable people

Alumni

Faculty

Notes

References

Further reading

External links

 
1910 establishments in Massachusetts